The Williams FW24 was the Formula One car with which the Williams team competed in the 2002 Formula One World Championship. It was driven by German Ralf Schumacher and Colombian Juan Pablo Montoya, in their fourth and second seasons with the team respectively.

Design and development 
The car was closely based on the previous year's FW23, and powered by a development of the ultra-powerful BMW engine from 2001, but the FW24 was aerodynamically inferior to the Ferrari F2002 and the McLaren MP4-17, while the BMW engine turned out to be unreliable despite its outright power.

Williams began the season with Compaq sponsorship. However, from the 2002 British Grand Prix onwards, the team had title sponsorship from Hewlett-Packard, following the merger between the two companies.

Season summary 
The car proved competitive; however, the Ferrari F2002 proved to be more powerful. Ralf Schumacher scored the team's only win of the season in Malaysia, and Juan Pablo Montoya finishing second saw the team register their first 1-2 finish since the 1996 Portuguese Grand Prix. 

Montoya set a run of five consecutive pole positions with the car in midseason (eventually getting seven during the season), and completed the then fastest lap of any circuit in Formula 1 history during qualifying, setting pole position at Monza for the Italian Grand Prix (on a track that favours engine power) with a lap average of 161.449 mph (259.827 km/h), completing the lap in 1:20.264, breaking the record previously set by former Williams driver Keke Rosberg at the 1985 British Grand Prix at Silverstone who lapped at an average of 160.9 mph (258.9 km/h) in his Honda turbo-powered Williams FW10.

Williams finished second in the Constructors' Championship but over 100 points behind Ferrari, with Montoya and Schumacher third and fourth respectively in the Drivers' Championship.

Complete Formula One results
(key) (results in bold indicate pole position) 

 Driver did not finish the Grand Prix but was classified as he completed over 90% of the race distance.

References

External links

Williams Formula One cars
2002 Formula One season cars